Ilie Nițu (born 12 November 1931) is a Romanian former sports shooter. He competed in the 50 metre pistol event at the 1960 Summer Olympics.

References

External links
 

1931 births
Possibly living people
Romanian male sport shooters
Olympic shooters of Romania
Shooters at the 1960 Summer Olympics
People from Giurgiu County